Geoff Richardson (26 August 1924 – 20 August 2007) was a British racing driver. Although he never entered a World Championship Formula One event, he took part in the 1948 British Grand Prix, participated in many non-championship Formula One and Formula Libre events from the 1940s to the 1960s, and enjoyed a varied motorsport career over several decades. He often raced self-built cars, many under the name of Richardson Racing Automobiles (RRA), among them a modified pre-war Riley, and sports cars based on Aston Martins. In 1953 he agreed to run a prototype Zethrin Rennsport in European events with the Belgian Jacques Swaters, but this project never got past a road-going prototype.

Richardson also took part in the Targa Florio in 1955, and the Intercontinental Formula that was devised as a rival to the new official 1.5-litre Formula One series in 1961.

Results

Non-championship Formula One results
(key)

Other results

Formula One
1948 Jersey Road Race – 11th (ERA-Riley)
1948 British Grand Prix – Ret (Riley-ERA)
1949 British Empire Trophy – 11th (RRA-ERA)
1949 BRDC International Trophy – 21st (RRA-ERA)

Targa Florio
1955 Targa Florio – Ret (Lotus Connaught-Lea Francis)

Intercontinental Formula
1961 Lavant Cup – 9th (Cooper RRA-Alta)
1961 BRDC International Trophy – Ret (Cooper-Climax)

References

1924 births
2007 deaths
British racing drivers
British Formula One drivers